Jonathan William Greenert (born May 15, 1953) is a former United States Navy admiral who served as the 30th Chief of Naval Operations from September 23, 2011, to September 18, 2015. He previously served as the 36th Vice Chief of Naval Operations from August 13, 2009, to August 22, 2011.  Prior to that, he served as Commander, U.S. Fleet Forces Command from September 29, 2007, to July 29, 2009, deputy chief of Naval Operations for Integration of Capabilities and Resources from September 2006 to September 2007, and commander of U.S. Seventh Fleet from August 2004 to September 2006. He retired from the navy after over 40 years of service. In March 2016, the National Bureau of Asian Research announced that Greenert would become the third holder of the John M. Shalikashvili Chair in National Security Studies (Shali Chair) at NBR. In April 2016, Greenert was appointed to the board of directors for BAE Systems for a three-year term.

Early life and education
Born in the Pittsburgh suburb of Butler, Pennsylvania, on May 15, 1953, Greenert attended Butler Catholic School and Butler Senior High School. While in high school, he participated in Pennsylvania Keystone Boys State, an American Legion leadership program. He graduated from the United States Naval Academy in 1975 with a Bachelor of Science degree in ocean engineering and completed studies in nuclear power for service as a submarine officer.

Naval career

Greenert's career as a submariner included assignments on board  as electrical material officer,  as electrical/operations officer, and submarine NR-1 as engineer officer. In 1992, he was awarded the Vice Admiral James Bond Stockdale Award for Inspirational Leadership by the commander of United States Pacific Fleet.

Following his command at sea, Greenert served as commander of Submarine Squadron 11, and Commander, Submarine Forces Pacific (COMSUBPAC) Representative West Coast from July 1996 to June 1997.

Flag assignments
In July 1997, Greenert reported as chief of staff for Commander, United States Seventh Fleet, in Yokosuka, Japan. During his tour in Japan, he was selected for flag rank and subsequently served as commander of United States Pacific Command, representative to Micronesia/Commander, U.S. Naval Forces, Marianas, from October 1998 through December 1999. On August 6, 2004, Greenert assumed command of Seventh Fleet.

Greenert's shore assignments include tours as COMSUBPAC staff fire control officer, program analyst for Office of the Chief of Naval Operations and the Chief of Naval Operations Strategic Studies Group and head of Navy Program Planning and Development Branch for the Chief of Naval Operations Staff in Washington, D.C. He served as director of the Operations Division in the Navy Comptroller Office from January 2000 through August 2002, and as deputy and chief of staff of U.S. Pacific Fleet from August 2002 until July 2004.

On September 23, 2011, Greenert became the 30th Chief of Naval Operations, succeeding Admiral Gary Roughead.

Post-retirement
On March 3, 2016, the National Bureau of Asian Research announced that Greenert would become the third holder of the John M. Shalikashvili Chair in National Security Studies (Shali Chair) at NBR. At NBR, Greenert brings to bear his years of experience in the U.S. Navy to help inform policy debates on critical issues pertaining to the Asia-Pacific through briefings of senior leaders, and research and writing.

The board chairman of Arlington-based BAE Systems Inc., Michael Chertoff, a former secretary of Homeland Security, announced on April 19, 2016, that retired Greenert was appointed to the board of directors for BAE Systems for a three-year term. "Admiral Greenert brings a wealth of knowledge and expertise from a distinguished, 40-year career as a senior military officer and government leader," Chertoff said in a statement. "His experience in management, operations, and strategic planning will be highly valuable, and I'm pleased to welcome him to the board."

Awards and decorations

Family

Greenert is married to Darleen Greenert, who was the Sponsor for the pre-commissioning unit (PCU) USS Hyman G. Rickover (SSN-795), and christened the ship during a ceremony at General Dynamics Electric Boat shipyard facility in Groton, Connecticut, on 31 July 2021.

References

External links

|-

|-

|-

|-

|-

1953 births
Chiefs of Naval Operations
Grand Cordons of the Order of the Rising Sun
Living people
People from Butler, Pennsylvania
Recipients of the Defense Distinguished Service Medal
Recipients of the Navy Distinguished Service Medal
Recipients of the Distinguished Service Medal (US Army)
Recipients of the Air Force Distinguished Service Medal
Recipients of the Coast Guard Distinguished Service Medal
Recipients of the Defense Superior Service Medal
Recipients of the Legion of Merit
Recipients of the Vice Admiral James Bond Stockdale Award for Inspirational Leadership
United States Naval Academy alumni
United States Navy admirals
Vice Chiefs of Naval Operations
Military personnel from Pennsylvania